The 1931 Oglethorpe Stormy Petrels football team represented Oglethorpe University in the sport of American football during the 1931 college football season. The first game of the season against rival, Chattanooga, gave Oglethorpe her first loss at Hermance Stadium. Oglethorpe defeated Wake Forest at home on Friday, November 13.

Schedule

References

Oglethorpe
Oglethorpe Stormy Petrels football seasons
Oglethorpe Stormy Petrels football